The 1998–99 Hellenic Football League season was the 46th in the history of the Hellenic Football League, a football competition in England.

Premier Division

The Premier Division featured 18 clubs which competed in the division last season, along with one new club:
Cirencester Academy, promoted from Division One

Also, Endsleigh changed name to EFC Cheltenham.

League table

Division One

Division One featured 15 clubs which competed in the division last season, along with two new clubs:
Forest Green Rovers reserves
Worcester College Old Boys

League table

References

External links
 Hellenic Football League

1998-99
8